Eteoryctis is a genus of moths in the family Gracillariidae.

Etymology

Species
Eteoryctis deversa (Meyrick, 1922) 
Eteoryctis gemoniella (Stainton, 1862) 
Eteoryctis picrasmae Kumata & Kuroko, 1988
Eteoryctis syngramma (Meyrick, 1914)

References

External links
Global Taxonomic Database of Gracillariidae (Lepidoptera)

Acrocercopinae
Gracillarioidea genera